Renato D'Agostin (born in 1983) is an Italian photographer, best known for his black and white silver gelatin prints and his books.

D'Agostin used to live and work in New York City and is now based near Venice, Italy. He is represented by Galerie Thierry Bigaignon (Paris, France).

Work 

Renato D'Agostin's work can be described as being graphic, contrasty and minimalist. His compositions are all about the relationship between the spaces he evolves in during his various trips abroad and the people he encounters within, bringing to his images a specific atmosphere. His work has been exhibited in many different countries among which USA, Italy, Spain, France and Japan. D'Agostin was the assistant to American photographer Ralph Gibson and he is known for making his own prints in the darkroom.  

It has received extensive coverage in the international press

Renato D'Agostin's work marks a shift with his series entitled "Harmony of Chaos" in which he departs from a classical approach to a more conceptual/abstract photography.

His work includes the following series:
 Harmony of Chaos (2019)
 Dirt, in collaboration with Vittoria Gerardi (2018)
 7439 (2016)
 Los Angeles Archaelogies (2015)
 Kapadokya (2015)
 Etna (2013)
 The Beautiful Cliche (2011)
 Tokyo Untitled (2009)
 Metropolis (2008)

Publications 

 Harmony of Chaos, the(M) editions, 2019
 Dirt, Hyakutake Editions, 2018
 Orbit, IIKKI Books, 2018
 Valsanzibio, Nomadic Editions, 2017
 Proxemics, The (M) Editions, 2016
 7439, Nomadic Editions, 2016
 Archaeologies: Los Angeles, Furlined, 2015
 Kapadokya, Nomadic Editions, 2015
 Frecce, Automatic Books, 2014
 Acrobats, Nomadic Editions, 2014
 Etna, Nomadic Editions, 2013
 The Beautiful Cliché – Venezia, Silvana Editoriale, 2012
 Tokyo Untitled, MC2 Gallery Edizioni, 2009
 0.00 Night Moleskine, Zeropuntozerozero + Moleskine, 2008
 Un giorno con Lucia, Zeropuntozerozero, 2007
 Metropolis, Zeropuntozerozero, 2007

References 

Italian photographers
1983 births
Living people
Italian expatriates in the United States